Jussarö is an island and national park in Ekenäs, Raseborg, Finland. Jussarö is known for the Jussarö Lighthouse. There is also an iron ore mine, but it was closed in 1967. The iron ore occurrence is the biggest undersea deposit in Finland and caused ships' compasses to malfunction.

In Jussarö, some abandoned buildings still remain, which were used by the military until 2005 for urban war simulations.  Many semi-destroyed structures remain from that time, featured in the 2019 TV-series Abandoned Engineering. Jussarö is known as the only ghost town in Finland.  Part of the island is open to visitors.

Russian prisoners worked in the undersea Jussarö mines in the 19th century.  Conditions were very harsh.  The island also had its own parish.

Lilla Jussarö 
Approximately  to the north of Jussarö is Lilla Jussarö.  This smaller island, consisting of a few houses and a harbour was once owned by Nokia.

External links 
 
   www.jussaro.fi   
 Photos from Jussarö at panoramio.com
 Jussarö lighthouse / Virtual Boat Trip
 YLE (Finnish Broadcasting Corporation) 

Ghost towns in Europe
Finnish islands in the Baltic
Former populated places in Finland
Mining communities in Finland
Islands of Uusimaa
Raseborg